Our Miss Pemberton is a British television programme which aired on the BBC from 1957 to 1958. A drama, it was about life in a small town. All 56 episodes were broadcast live and no telerecordings appear to have survived, leaving them lost.

It starred Margot Boyd, James Clifton, Aimée Delamain, Vincent Goodman and Terence Soall.

References

External links
Our Miss Pemberton on IMDb

BBC television dramas
1950s British drama television series
1957 British television series debuts
1958 British television series endings
Lost BBC episodes
BBC Television shows
Black-and-white British television shows